Ashley Little (born 1983) is a Canadian author of both adult and young adult literature.

Early life and education
Little was born in Calgary, Alberta. She earned her bachelor of fine arts in creative writing and film studies at the University of Victoria and an MFA in creative writing from University of British Columbia. She lives in British Columbia's Okanagan Valley.

Career

Little's debut novel PRICK: Confessions of a Tattoo Artist was published by Tightrope Books in 2011. Prick was shortlisted for the ReLit Award. 
Her second novel The New Normal (Orca Book Publishers, 2013) is for young adults. The New Normal won the Sheila A. Egoff Children's Literature Prize at the 2014 BC Book Prizes. Her third novel, Anatomy of a Girl Gang (Arsenal Pulp Press, 2013) won the Ethel Wilson Fiction Prize at the 2014 BC Book Prizes, one of two awards Little won that year. Anatomy of a Girl Gang was a Finalist for the 2014 City of Vancouver Book Award and longlisted for the 2015 International IMPAC Dublin Literary Award.

Little's short fiction has appeared in various literary journals and anthologies, including Room (2010), Broken Pencil (2011), and Writing Without Direction: 10 1/2 Short Stories by Canadian Authors Under 30.

Little served as the 2014 writer in residence for Calgary's Alexandra Writers Centre Society, and as the 2015 Vancouver Public Library Writer in Residence. Little served as the 2017 Edna Staebler Writer in Residence for Wilfrid Laurier University.

References

External links

1983 births
Living people
Canadian writers of young adult literature
Canadian women novelists
21st-century Canadian novelists
Writers from Calgary
University of Victoria alumni
Writers from British Columbia
Women writers of young adult literature
21st-century Canadian women writers